Ryne Dee Sandberg (born September 18, 1959), nicknamed "Ryno", is an American former professional baseball player, coach, and manager. He played sixteen seasons in Major League Baseball (MLB) as a second baseman for the Philadelphia Phillies (1981) and the Chicago Cubs (1982–1994, 1996–1997).

His career .989 fielding percentage was a major-league record at second base when he retired in 1997. He has the most Silver Slugger Awards for a second baseman with seven. Sandberg was elected to the National Baseball Hall of Fame in January 2005; he was formally inducted in ceremonies on July 31, 2005. He resigned from his managerial duties for the Phillies on June 26, 2015, and was succeeded by Pete Mackanin.

Early life
Born and raised in Spokane, Washington, Sandberg's parents were Elizabeth, a nurse, and Derwent D. "Sandy" Sandberg, a mortician. He was named for relief pitcher Ryne Duren.

Sandberg was a three-sport star in high school at North Central and graduated in 1978. The previous fall he was named to Parade Magazine'''s High School All-America football team, one of the eight quarterbacks, and one of two players from the state of Washington. The school's baseball field was named in his honor in 1985 as "Ryne Sandberg Field", and his varsity number was retired in both football and baseball.

Sandberg was recruited to play quarterback at NCAA Division I colleges, and eventually signed a letter of intent with Washington State University in Pullman. He opted not to attend after being selected in the 20th round of the 1978 baseball amateur draft by the Philadelphia Phillies.Kepner, Tyler. Hall of Famer's Slow Road to a Major League Bench. New York Times, 2010-08-09.

Minor leagues
Sandberg was reportedly drafted after Bill Harper and Wilbur “Moose” Johnson, both Philadelphia Phillies scouts, persuaded Phillies director of scouting Dallas Green to draft Sandberg, despite his college football commitment. After the Phillies drafted Sandberg, Harper reportedly met with Sandberg, his parents, and brother Del at the Sandberg home. "His parents, particularly his mother, were very concerned about Ryne going to college and getting an education," Harper recalled. Sandberg reportedly received a $20,000 bonus, accepting the offer after taking a walk with his brother during the meeting.

In 1978, at age 18, Sandberg began his professional career after being drafted by the Phillies. Sandberg played for the Helena Phillies in the Rookie level Pioneer League. In his first professional season, Sandberg played exclusively at shortstop and hit .311 with a .390 OBP, 1 home run, 15 stolen bases and 23 RBI in 56 games. Among his teammates at Helena were George Bell, a future MVP, and Bob Dernier, who would later form the "Daily Double" with Sandberg in Chicago. The three would advance through the Phillies system as teammates.

Remaining at shortstop in 1979, Sandberg played for the Class A level Spartanburg Phillies in the Western Carolinas League. In 138 games, Sandberg hit .247 with 7 triples, 4 home runs, 21 stolen bases and 47 RBI.

Sandberg played for the Class AA level Reading Phillies of the Eastern League in 1980. With Reading, Sandberg hit .310, with a .403 OBP, 12 triples, 32 stolen bases, 11 home runs and 79 RBI. Playing in 129 games for Reading, Sandberg drew 73 bases on balls against 72 strikeouts. In the field, Sandberg played 120 games at shortstop and 4 at third base. Sandberg was selected to the Eastern League All-Star team

Advancing to the Class AAA level Oklahoma City 89ers in 1981, Sandberg played 133 games before being called up by the Philadelphia Phillies. With Oklahoma City, Sandberg remained primarily at shortstop while playing 17 games at second base. Sandberg hit .293, with a .352 OBP, 32 stolen bases, 9 home runs and 62 RBI.

Philadelphia Phillies
Playing in 13 games, Sandberg had one hit in six at-bats for a .167 batting average during his brief stint with the team. The one hit occurred at Wrigley Field using a bat borrowed from starting shortstop Larry Bowa.

The Phillies soon concluded that Sandberg was not a successor to Bowa at shortstop. While Sandberg had played both second and third base in the minor leagues, he was blocked from those positions by Manny Trillo and Mike Schmidt. He was traded along with Bowa to the Cubs for shortstop Iván DeJesús prior to the  season. The trade, now reckoned as one of the most lopsided deals in baseball history, came about after negotiations for a new contract between Bowa and the Phillies broke down.

Cubs general manager Dallas Green wanted a young prospect to go along with the aging Bowa (as it turned out, Bowa's playing career ended after the 1985 season). Green had been instrumental in the drafting of Sandberg in 1978, while working in the Phillies front office. The two remained close over the years. Years later, Phillies general manager Paul Owens said that he hadn't wanted to trade Sandberg, but Green and the Cubs weren't interested in any of the other prospects he offered. Owens then went back to his scouts, who said Sandberg wouldn't be any more than a utility infielder. However, Sandberg had hit over .290 in the minors two years in a row. The trade is now considered one of the best (if not the best) in recent Cubs history. At the same time, it is considered one of the worst trades in Phillies history. While DeJesus helped anchor the Phillies infield on their way to the 1983 World Series, he lasted only three years in Philadelphia, and was out of baseball by 1988.

Sandberg is one of two Hall of Famers who came up through the Phillies farm system and earned their Hall of Fame credentials primarily as Cubs, the other being Ferguson Jenkins. Similarly, Jenkins, then age 23, was traded to the Cubs in another trade that ended up heavily favoring the Cubs, a multi-player trade for 1960s workhorse pitcher Larry Jackson, then age 35, and Bob Buhl, then age 37, whose best days were behind him.

Chicago Cubs
The Cubs, who initially wanted Sandberg to play center field, installed him as their third baseman, and he went on to be one of the top-rated rookies of 1982. After the Cubs acquired veteran Ron Cey following the 1982 season, they moved Sandberg to second base, where he became a star.

1984
Bob Dernier was the leadoff hitter and gold glove center fielder for the Cubs in 1984, while Sandberg batted second. The pair was dubbed "The Daily Double" by Cubs announcer Harry Caray. In 1984 Sandberg's runs and triples totals led the National League.

After his great season in which he garnered national attention, he wrote an autobiography Ryno with Fred Mitchell.

"The Sandberg Game"

One game in particular was cited for putting Sandberg (as well as the 1984 Cubs in general) "on the map", an NBC national telecast of a Cardinals–Cubs game on June 23, . The Cubs had been playing well throughout the season's first few months, but as a team unaccustomed to winning, they had not yet become a serious contender in the eyes of most baseball fans.

As for Sandberg, he had played two full seasons in the major leagues, and while he had shown himself to be a top-fielding second baseman and fast on the basepaths (over 30 stolen bases both seasons), his .260-ish batting average and single-digit home run production were respectable for his position but not especially noteworthy, and Sandberg was not talked about outside Chicago. The Game of the Week, however, put the sleeper Cubs on the national stage against their regional rival, the St. Louis Cardinals. Both teams were well-established franchises with strong fan bases outside the Chicago and St. Louis areas.

In the ninth inning, the Cubs trailed 9–8, and faced the premier relief pitcher of the time, Bruce Sutter. Sutter was at the forefront of the emergence of the closer in the late 1970s and early 1980s and was especially dominant in 1984, saving 45 games. However, in the ninth inning, Sandberg, not yet known for his power, slugged a solo home run to left field against the Cardinals' ace closer, tying the game. Answering this dramatic act, the Cardinals scored two runs in the top of the tenth. Sandberg came up again in the tenth inning, facing a determined Sutter with a man on base. As Cubs' radio announcer Harry Caray described it: 

The Cubs went on to win in the 11th inning, with the winning run being driven in by a single off the bat of Dave Owen. The Cardinals' Willie McGee, who hit for the cycle during the game, had already been named NBC's Player of the Game before Sandberg's first home run; Sandberg later shared that distinction with McGee. As NBC play-by-play announcer Bob Costas, who called the game with Tony Kubek, said when Sandberg hit the second home run, "Do you believe it?!" The game is known as "The Sandberg Game".

1985
In , Sandberg batted .305 with 26 home runs, 83 RBIs, 113 runs scored and a career-high 54 stolen bases.

1990
In , Sandberg led the National League in home runs–a rarity for a second baseman–with 40. Sandberg was only the third second baseman to hit 40 home runs; Rogers Hornsby and Davey Johnson hit 42, and no American League second baseman had reached forty until Brian Dozier in 2016. Sandberg also batted in 100 runs, despite batting second in the order. His batting average did not suffer from his new level of power, as he finished at .306 for the season. Sandberg, Brady Anderson and Barry Bonds are the only players to have both a 40-homer (1990) and 50-steal season during their careers.

Sandberg played a then major league-record 123 straight games at second base without an error. This record was later broken in 2007 by Plácido Polanco, then of the Detroit Tigers. Sandberg played in front of his hometown fans in the 1990 MLB All-Star Game which was held in Wrigley Field, home of the Cubs. Sandberg won the Home Run Derby with three home runs over the left-field bleachers. Not until the Cincinnati Reds' Todd Frazier in  did another player win the Home Run Derby in his home stadium.

1991
In , Sandberg batted .291 with 26 home runs and batted in 100 runs for the second consecutive season. He also won his ninth consecutive Gold Glove at second base, breaking a tie he had shared with  Bill Mazeroski for most Gold Gloves at that position (Roberto Alomar has since broken this record).

1992
On March 2, Sandberg became the highest paid player in baseball at the time, signing a $28.4 million ($ today) four-year extension worth $7.1 million ($ today) a season. He earned a spot on the NL All-Star roster and an NL Silver Slugger Award at second base with a .304 batting average, 26 home runs, 100 runs, and 87 runs batted in.

1994
Sandberg, a notoriously slow early season starter, found himself struggling even more so than usual early in the 1994 season. With his average at a career low .238 and having recorded only 53 hits in 57 games, Sandberg decided to step away from baseball, and on June 13, 1994, he announced his retirement. In his book, Second to Home'', Sandberg said,

1996–1997

Sandberg's final game at Wrigley Field and final career hit were on September 21, 1997. This also was the final Wrigley Field game for Cubs broadcaster Harry Caray, who died during the following winter.

Post-playing career
Initially, Sandberg kept a low profile after retiring. He also appeared on ESPN Radio 1000 as an analyst during the  baseball season. He is also a former baseball columnist for Yahoo! Sports.

Hall of Fame induction
Sandberg delivered what many traditionalist fans considered a stirring speech at his Hall of Fame induction ceremony in 2005. He thanked the writers who voted for him because it meant that he played the game the way he had been taught it should be played. He spoke several times of respect for the game, and chided a subset of current players who, in his opinion, lack that respect. Specifically, he spoke of how the game needs more than home run hitters, citing that turning a double-play and laying down a sacrifice bunt are weapons many of today's greats don't value. He also made a strong pitch for induction of his former teammate, Andre Dawson, who was ultimately elected to join the Hall in 2010, and famously promoted the election of a long-snubbed former Cub to the Hall by saying, "For what it's worth, Ron Santo just earned one more vote on the Veterans Committee."

Number retirement

Following his Hall of Fame induction, Sandberg had his number 23 retired in a ceremony at Wrigley Field on August 28, . He became only the fourth Chicago Cub to have his number retired, following (in chronological order) Ernie Banks (#14), Billy Williams (#26), and Ron Santo (#10). Sandberg has worn his uniform number 23 in past jobs as a Cubs spring training instructor and Peoria Chiefs manager. He also wore that number during his time with the Iowa Cubs as their manager and as the manager of the Lehigh Valley IronPigs.

Managerial career
Sandberg formerly served as a spring training instructor for the Cubs in Mesa, Arizona.

2007–2010

On December 5, 2006, Sandberg was named manager of the Cubs' Class-A Peoria Chiefs in the Midwest League. In his first season as a manager, he took his team to the Midwest League championship game. In December 2008, Sandberg was promoted to manager of the Class Double-A Team Tennessee Smokies in the Southern League. In December 2009, he was again promoted, to manager of the Triple-A Iowa Cubs. Upon leading Iowa to an 82–62 record, the Pacific Coast League named him its 2010 Manager of the Year.

Sandberg has said that his ideal job was to manage the Chicago Cubs.  Former manager Lou Piniella suggested that Sandberg, as manager of the Cubs' top minor-league affiliate, would be in the mix to replace him when he retired after the 2010 season.
However, the position was given to interim manager Mike Quade.

2011–2015
On November 15, 2010, Sandberg left the Cubs organization and returned to his original organization as manager of the Phillies' top minor-league affiliate, the Lehigh Valley IronPigs. He led the IronPigs to their first-ever playoff appearance and the International League championship series. Baseball America named him its 2011 Minor League Manager of the Year.

After the 2012 season, Sandberg was promoted to third base coach and infield instructor of the Philadelphia Phillies. He was promoted to interim manager of the Phillies after they fired Charlie Manuel on August 16, 2013. Sandberg earned his first win as a manager against the Los Angeles Dodgers on Sunday August 18, 2013.

Phillies manager
On September 22, 2013, Sandberg was named permanent manager, with a three-year contract, with an option for 2017. He became the first Hall-of-Fame player to manage a team full-time since Frank Robinson managed the Montreal Expos/Washington Nationals from 2002–2006.

On April 26, 2015, Sandberg earned his 100th win as a major league manager on a 5–4 win against the Atlanta Braves. Two months later, on June 26, 2015, Sandberg resigned from the position of Phillies manager with his team in last place in the National League East Division at a record of 26–48, the worst record in Major League Baseball.

Cubs ambassador
In 2016, Sandberg joined the Cubs organization as a goodwill ambassador.  In this position, he makes public appearances at Cubs-related events, and attends Cubs games to meet and greet fans; and is an occasional color commentator for the team's telecasts on Marquee Sports Network.

Managerial record

Personal life
Sandberg married his high school sweetheart, Cindy, and the couple had two children, Justin and Lindsey. They divorced in July 1995. Sandberg married Margaret in August 1995. She has three children from her former marriage, BR, Adriane and Steven. He also has eight grandchildren. Ryne's nephew, Jared Sandberg, was a third baseman for the Tampa Bay Rays from 2001–2003.

Charity foundations
Sandberg and his wife, Margaret, founded Ryno Kid Care  to assist in the lives of children with serious illnesses. The organization provided anything from "big brothers" (mentors and older companions) to a home-cooked meal. Ryno Kid Care also provided massage therapists and clowns dressed up as doctors and nurses to brighten the children's day.

Ryno Kid Care's mission was "dedicated to enhancing the lives of children with serious medical conditions and their families, by providing supportive, compassionate and meaningful programming." Ryno Kid Care is no longer in operation.

Awards 
Sandberg was inducted as a Laureate of The Lincoln Academy of Illinois and awarded the Order of Lincoln (the State’s highest honor) by the Governor of Illinois in 2017.

See also

List of athletes who came out of retirement
List of Major League Baseball annual home run leaders
List of Major League Baseball annual runs scored leaders
List of Major League Baseball annual triples leaders
List of Major League Baseball career home run leaders
List of Major League Baseball career hits leaders
List of Major League Baseball career doubles leaders
List of Major League Baseball career runs scored leaders
List of Major League Baseball career runs batted in leaders
List of Major League Baseball career stolen bases leaders

References

External links

Ryne Sandberg at SABR (Baseball BioProject)
Ryne Sandberg at Baseball Almanac
Ryne Sandberg at Baseball Library
Ryne Sandberg at Pura Pelota (Venezuelan Professional Baseball League)

1959 births
Living people
Águilas del Zulia players
American expatriate baseball players in Venezuela
Baseball players from Spokane, Washington
Chicago Cubs announcers
Chicago Cubs players
Daytona Cubs players
Gold Glove Award winners
Helena Phillies players
Iowa Cubs managers
Lehigh Valley IronPigs managers
Major League Baseball broadcasters
Major League Baseball players with retired numbers
Major League Baseball second basemen
National Baseball Hall of Fame inductees
National League All-Stars
National League home run champions
National League Most Valuable Player Award winners
Oklahoma City 89ers players
Orlando Cubs players
Philadelphia Phillies coaches
Philadelphia Phillies managers
Philadelphia Phillies players
Reading Phillies players
Silver Slugger Award winners
Spartanburg Phillies players